A group hug is a hug that consists of more than two persons.

Group hug or Group Hug may also refer to:

Group Hug (film), former working title of the 2012 film The Avengers
Group Hug Tour, 2012 concert tour by Kreayshawn